Penny Moore (born January 25, 1969) is a former Women's National Basketball Association (WNBA) player. She played in the league from its inception in 1997 to 1999. She played for the Charlotte Sting in 1997, then for the Washington Mystics in 1998 and 1999. She attended J.E.B. Stuart High School in Falls Church, Virginia.

USA Basketball
Moore was named to the USA Basketball Women's Junior National Team (now called the U19 team). The team participated in the second Junior World Championship, held in Bilbao, Spain in July 1989. The USA team lost their opening game to South Korea in overtime, then lost a two-point game to Australia. After winning their next game against Bulgaria, the USA team again fell in a close game, losing by three points to Czechoslovakia. After beating Zaire in their next game, the USA team played Spain, and fell three points short. Moore  averaged 3.0 points per game. The USA team finished in seventh place.

References

1969 births
Living people
American expatriate basketball people in Finland
American expatriate basketball people in Germany
American expatriate basketball people in Israel
American expatriate basketball people in Luxembourg
Charlotte Sting players
Long Beach State Beach women's basketball players
Parade High School All-Americans (girls' basketball)
Washington Mystics players
Basketball players from Virginia
American women's basketball players
Sportspeople from Fairfax County, Virginia